Music Inspired by More than a Game is the official soundtrack album name for music taken from and inspired by the documentary film More than a Game. The film is centered on the life of LeBron James and was released in October 2009. The soundtrack and film were both executive produced by Harvey Mason Jr. on behalf of Interscope Records and Lionsgate. The soundtrack album was released on September 28, 2009 in the United Kingdom and September 29, 2009 in the United States by Zone 4 and Interscope Records.

Film synopsis 

More than a Game is a 2009 documentary film that follows basketball superstar LeBron James and four of his talented teammates through the trials and tribulations of high school basketball in Ohio and James' journey to fame. The trailer was released in April featuring the Mary J. Blige song "Stronger". The fourth singles of "Drop It Low", "Stronger", "Forever" and "Frozen" All of the singles had music videos made for them. The track "Top of the World" by Rich Boy feat. Chil Chil also had a music video made, in 2009.

Track listing
1. Ester Dean featuring Chris Brown - "Drop It Low" 3:10

2.  Drake, Eminem, Kanye West and Lil Wayne - "Forever" 5:57

3.  T.I. featuring Young Dro - "King On Set" 3:43

4.  Mary J. Blige - "Stronger" 4:03

5. Jay-Z - "History" 4:39

6.  Rich Boy featuring Chili Chil - "Top of the World" 4:04

7. Soulja Boy Tell'em - "I'm Ballin (produced by HamSquad) 3:35

8.  Ya Boy - "We Ready" 3:39

9.  Hayes - "Go Hard" 4:08

10.  Jared Evan - "Frozen" 3:51

11.  Charlie Wilson, Faith Evans, JoJo, Jordin Sparks, Omarion, Steve Russell,  Tamar Braxton, Tank, Toni Braxton and Tyrese - "If You Dream" 5:03

Personnel 
 Executive producer: Harvey Mason Jr.
 Conception and distribution: Interscope Records, Lions Gate Entertainment
 Vocals: Ester Dean, Drake, T.I., Mary J. Blige, Jay Z, Rich Boy, Soulja Boy, Ya Boy, Hayes, Jared Evan, Tank
 Guest vocals: Chris Brown, Kanye West, Lil Wayne, Eminem, Young Dro, Chili Chil, Tyrese, Toni Braxton, Jordin Sparks, Omarion, Faith Evans, JoJo, Charlie Wilson, Tamar Braxton, Steve Russell, Tony Williams
 Producers: Jamal Polow da Don Jones, Mattew "Boi-1da" Samuels, C. Harris, D. Quinn, L. Edwards, Hit Boy, Kanye West, Hamsquad, Kenoe, Jason Perry, Jerome Harmon, Harvey Mason Jr., Jared Evan, J. Valentine, Durrell "Tank" Babbs,
 Production associates: Zone 4 Productions & Zone 4 inc, 1da-Boi Productions, The Smash Factory Productions, Very Good Beats, NIghtrydas Productions, Harvey Mason Media, Song Dynasty, HamSquad Inc.

Release history

Chart positions

References 

2007 soundtrack albums
Albums produced by Hit-Boy
Albums produced by Kanye West
Albums produced by Polow da Don
Hip hop soundtracks
Interscope Records soundtracks
Albums produced by Lil' C (record producer)
Albums produced by Mars (record producer)
Documentary film soundtracks